Pink Doll is the second Japanese  full-length studio album by the South Korean girl group Apink, and was released by Universal Music Japan on December 21, 2016.

Editions
The album was originally released in four different editions: Limited Edition A, Limited Edition B, Limited Edition C and the Regular Edition.

Track listing

References

External links
 
 
 
 
 

2016 albums
Apink albums
Universal Music Japan albums
Japanese-language albums
Cube Entertainment albums